The Big Sick is a 2017 American romantic comedy film directed by Michael Showalter and written by Emily V. Gordon and Kumail Nanjiani. It stars Nanjiani, Zoe Kazan, Holly Hunter, Ray Romano, Adeel Akhtar, and Anupam Kher. Gordon and Nanjiani wrote the film based on their relationship; it follows an interracial couple who must deal with cultural differences after Emily (Kazan) becomes ill.

The film had its world premiere at the Sundance Film Festival on January 20, 2017. It began a limited theatrical release on June 23, 2017, by Amazon Studios and Lionsgate, before going wide on July 14, 2017. One of the most acclaimed films of 2017, it was chosen by American Film Institute as one of the top 10 films of the year and was nominated for the Academy Award for Best Original Screenplay. With a budget of $5 million, it grossed $56 million worldwide, becoming one of the highest-grossing independent films of 2017.

Plot

Kumail is an Uber driver and struggling stand-up comedian in Chicago. His parents are first-generation immigrants from Pakistan, who live outside the city. One evening, after performing at the local comedy club, Kumail sleeps with a graduate student from the University of Chicago called Emily. He drives her home and they agree not to meet again. 

Kumail visits his family over the weekend, where his mother tries to set him up for an arranged marriage. Kumail is not interested but plays along. Meanwhile, Kumail and Emily keep hooking up and eventually start dating. Emily confesses to him her past divorce, then reveals she feels strongly about him. Kumail, however, dodges any requests to meet her parents. When she finds out that he has been seeing other women for potential marriage, she breaks up with him. 

Kumail moves on, focusing on stand-up and securing an audition for the Montreal Comedy Festival. One night, he is informed that Emily has been admitted to the hospital. He goes to drive her home, but is pressured by doctors into giving permission to place Emily into an induced coma for treatment. Kumail signs the medical release, then informs Emily's parents in Iowa.

Terry and Beth arrive the next day. They are hostile to Kumail for his break-up with Emily, but Terry allows Kumail to continue visiting. Emily undergoes surgery for a rapidly-spreading infection, but fails to stabilize. Doctors are unable to diagnose her illness, and Beth ponders moving her to a better hospital.

Distracted with Emily's condition, Kumail ignores his parents' continued demands about marriage. He tells them about Emily and they refuse to speak with him. Meanwhile, Emily's infection grows unchecked. Kumail learns that she could die, causing him to fail his Montreal audition.

The next morning, Emily's health suddenly improves and she is brought out of the coma. Terry and Beth, who have grown to like Kumail during this time, ask him to visit. Emily is diagnosed with a rare adult-onset Still's disease. She will fully recover but has lower inhibitions, and throws Kumail out when he arrives to see her. At a party celebrating her recovery, Kumail asks Emily to get back together but she refuses. 

Emily later watches a video of Kumail's Montreal audition. She realizes the extent of his efforts to keep seeing her despite family pressure, and visits him at the local theatre. Kumail informs that he is moving to New York City to pursue stand-up. Emily is disappointed but wishes him luck.

Kumail starts to patch his relationship with his family before leaving Chicago. In NYC, he performs at a local club and is heckled, albeit encouragingly, by a female audience member. He turns to see that it is Emily, and she hints that she is there to meet him.

Cast 

 Kumail Nanjiani as a fictionalized version of himself, an aspiring standup comic
 Zoe Kazan as Emily Gardner, Kumail's girlfriend. She is a fictionalized version of Kumail's wife Emily V. Gordon
 Holly Hunter as Beth Gardner, Emily's mother
 Ray Romano as Terry Gardner, Emily's father
 Anupam Kher as Azmat Nanjiani, Kumail's father
 Zenobia Shroff as Sharmeen Nanjiani, Kumail's mother
 Adeel Akhtar as Naveed Nanjiani, Kumail's brother
 Bo Burnham as CJ, a standup comic and Kumail's friend
 Aidy Bryant as Mary, a standup comic and Kumail's friend
 Kurt Braunohler as Chris, a standup comic and Kumail's friend and roommate
 Vella Lovell as Khadija, a woman Kumail's parents set him up with

 Jeremy Shamos as Bob Dalavan, a talent agent
 David Alan Grier as Andy Dodd, the owner of the Playground Stadium and MC for its comedy shows
 Ed Herbstman as Sam Highsmith, a standup comic who is not liked by the others
 Shenaz Treasurywala as Fatima Nanjiani, Kumail's sister-in-law
 Rebecca Naomi Jones as Jessie
 Kuhoo Verma as Zubeida
 Mitra Jouhari as Yazmin
 Celeste Arias as Denise
 Jeff Blumenkrantz as Dr. Wright
 Linda Emond as Dr. Cunningham
 Susham Bedi as Tina, Khadija's mother
 Rahul Bedi as Farhan, Khadija's father

Production 
In December 2015, it was announced Kumail Nanjiani would star in the film from a screenplay written by him and wife Emily V. Gordon, while Judd Apatow would produce alongside Barry Mendel, under their Apatow Productions banner, while FilmNation Entertainment would finance the film. Michael Andrews composed the film's score.

Casting 
In February 2016, Zoe Kazan joined the cast, along with Holly Hunter and Ray Romano in April 2016. Unlike many of the other portrayals in The Big Sick, Romano's and Hunter's roles in the film were not modeled after Emily V. Gordon's actual parents. Instead, Hunter said that she never contacted or spoke with Gordon's mother before playing the part, as she wanted to "feel my own freedom with the character". In May 2016, Aidy Bryant, Bo Burnham, Adeel Akhtar and Kurt Braunohler also joined the cast of the film. David Alan Grier was cast in The Big Sick after he met with Gordon when she was a writer for The Carmichael Show. Grier's role was part of a larger subplot that was ultimately cut from the film's release.

Anupam Kher's casting in the film was reported in June 2016. He was directly contacted by Kumail Nanjiani, as Nanjiani's father had recommended Kher play the role. According to Kher, his character's last scene in the film was the first scene he had filmed for the production. The Big Sick marks Kher's 500th appearance in a feature film.

Writing 
The screenplay for The Big Sick is written by Emily V. Gordon and her husband Kumail Nanjiani and is loosely based on the real-life courtship between them before their marriage in 2007. According to Nanjiani, the idea to make a script about them was first inspired by the film's eventual co-producer Judd Apatow when the two met while appearing in a 2012 episode of the You Made It Weird podcast. Developed over the course of three years, the script has been called semi-autobiographical because, in addition to the two lead characters modeled after them, many of the events occurring during Gordon and Nanjiani's relationship are noted as being portrayed to an extent in the film.

Though not part of the original script, a real-life incident involving Holly Hunter heckling an unnamed player during a US Open tennis match inspired a similar scene in the film where Nanjiani's character is heckled during one of his stand-up sets.

Filming 
Principal photography began on May 11, 2016.

Release 
The Big Sick premiered at the Sundance Film Festival on January 20, 2017. Shortly after, Amazon Studios acquired distribution rights to the film, after bids from Sony Pictures and Fox Searchlight Pictures. The $12 million acquisition marked the second-largest deal of the 2017 festival. Lionsgate partnered with Amazon on the U.S. release, and spent around $20 million on marketing the film. It also screened at South by Southwest on March 16, 2017, where it won an Audience Award in the category Festival Favorites. The film began a limited release on June 23, 2017, before going wide on July 14, 2017.

Controversy 
There was backlash for the movie due to South Asian women being portrayed as stereotypical and undesirable. Also, Vella Lovell, a half White and Black actress who is not of South Asian descent, played a Pakistani love interest with a strained accent.

In October 2021, Kumail Nanjiani said, "Our movie was the first one in a long time where there were multiple Desi female characters, and the first few you see are reduced...People wanted to see themselves. It’s something I completely regret. I would not do it that way now.”

Reception

Box office 
The Big Sick grossed $42.9 million in the United States and Canada, and $13.4 million in other territories, for a total gross of $56.2 million.

In the film's limited opening weekend, it made $421,577 from five theaters (a per-theater gross of $84,315, the best of 2017 until Lady Bird in November), finishing 17th at the box office. The film expanded to 2,597 theaters on July 14, 2017, and was projected to gross $9–11 million over the weekend. It grossed $7.6 million over the weekend, finishing fifth at the box office. On July 25, the film crossed $26 million, becoming the second highest-grossing independent film of 2017.

Critical response 
On review aggregator Rotten Tomatoes, the film holds an approval rating of 98% based on 303 reviews, with an average rating of 8.30/10. The site's critical consensus reads, "Funny, heartfelt, and intelligent, The Big Sick uses its appealing leads and cross-cultural themes to prove the standard romcom formula still has some fresh angles left to explore." It was rated as Rotten Tomatoes' #1 summer movie of 2017. On Metacritic, the film received an average score of 86 out of 100, based on 47 critics, indicating "universal acclaim." Audiences polled by CinemaScore gave the film an average grade of "A" on an A+ to F scale.

In a review for the Toronto Star, Peter Howell gave The Big Sick four stars out of four, praising the film as "hilarious and heartbreaking", as well as applauding the performances of the entire cast. Richard Roeper of the Chicago Sun-Times praised the film: "It is funny and smart and wise and silly, it is romantic and sweet and just cynical enough, and it is without a doubt one of the best romantic comedies I have seen in a long time." The Big Sick was also selected as an "NYT Critic's Pick" by Manohla Dargis of The New York Times. In her review, Dargis praised Michael Showalter's direction and the screenplay by Emily V. Gordon and Kumail Nanjiani for "revitalizing an often moribund subgenre with a true story of love, death and the everyday comedy of being a 21st-century American."

While praising the lead performances, Robbie Collin of The Daily Telegraph wrote a mixed review for The Big Sick. Collin contends that director Showalter "never comes close to dampening down its leading couple's inextinguishable appeal." In a negative review for The New Yorker, Richard Brody wrote that the film "suffers from an excess of pleasantness, and this very pleasantness thins out its substance, blands out its tone, weakens its comedy."

Accolades 
According to a poll conducted by AwardsDaily in July 2017, polling one hundred critics, The Big Sick was voted the second best film of 2017 so far, behind Get Out.

See also
 Satte Pe Satta. At minute 1:54:56 in The Big Sick, the father of the co-star (played by Kumail Nanjiani) reveals that he and the mother saw Satte Pe Satta on their first date.

References

External links 

 

2017 romantic comedy films
2017 films
American independent films
American romantic comedy films
Comedy films about Asian Americans
Asian-American romance films
FilmNation Entertainment films
Films about comedians
Films about diseases
Films about interracial romance
Films directed by Michael Showalter
Films produced by Judd Apatow
Films scored by Michael Andrews
Films set in hospitals
Films set in Chicago
Films shot in Chicago
Films set in New York City
Films shot in New York City
Films about Pakistani Americans
Apatow Productions films
2017 independent films
2010s English-language films
2010s American films